Trinity Church, Enfield is located at Church Street, Enfield, London. The church was formed in 1983 by the union of Enfield Methodist Church (formed 1890) and St Paul's United Reformed Church (formed 1902).

References

External links

\

Churches in the London Borough of Enfield
Buildings and structures in the London Borough of Enfield
Methodist churches in London
Enfield, London